HMS Sandwich (L12) was a  sloop built by Hawthorn Leslie, Newcastle. After a decade of peacetime service on the China Station, she escorted Atlantic convoys through World War II.

Construction and design
HMS Sandwich was ordered from Hawthorn Leslie on 19 September 1927, one of two Bridgwater-class sloops ordered from Hawthorn Leslie that day. The Bridgewaters were intended as replacements for the Flower-class sloops, and were to combine the role of peacetime patrol work at distant overseas stations (with the Bridgewaters being specifically intended for service in the Persian Gulf) with a wartime role as minesweepers.

Displacement was  standard and  full load. The ship was powered by two Parsons geared steam turbines, each driving one propeller shaft, using steam provided by two Admiralty three-drum boiler. The main armament consisted of a pair of QF four-inch (102 mm) Mk V guns on the ship's centreline, one forward and one aft, with the forward gun on a high-angle mount, capable of anti-aircraft fire and the second gun on a low-angle mount, for anti-surface use only. Two 3-pounder saluting guns were also carried, while the anti-submarine armament initially consisted of four depth charges. The ship's crew consisted of 96 officers and ratings.

Sandwich was laid down at Hawthorn Leslie's Tyneside shipyard on 9 February 1928 and was launched without ceremony on 29 September. Sandwich reached a speed of  during sea trials and was commissioned on 23 March 1929.

In 1938, the aft four-inch gun was replaced by one on a high-angle mounting and the two saluting guns were exchanged for a pair of quadruple Vickers  anti-aircraft (AA) machinegun mounts. By the outbreak of the Second World War, the ship had been fitted with ASDIC, and the depth charge outfit was increased to 15 charges.

Service

China Station
She was recommissioned with a new crew at Hong Kong in October 1931, remaining on the China Station. Sandwich, along with the cruiser  was based at Shanghai during the Shanghai Incident in early 1932. On 23 March 1932, while still at Shanghai, the American destroyer  collided with Sandwich and two Chinese barges. While Sandwich suffered minimal damage, Stewart ended up with a length of anchor chain off one of the barges wrapped around a propeller, requiring the propeller to be replaced. Sandwich again received a new crew at Hong Kong in April 1934. When the British owned steamer Tungchow went missing on 31 January 1935 on a voyage between Shanghai and Yantai, having been seized by pirates, Sandwich was one of several warships despatched to search for the missing ship. The pirates abandoned Tungchow when the ship was spotted by aircraft from the aircraft carrier .

In January 1938, as the Second Sino-Japanese War continued, Sandwich landed men at Weihaiwei to protect British property against rioting as Japanese forces advanced towards the city. The ship was refitted at Hong Kong from April to October 1938, recommissioning with a fresh crew in March 1939.

Second World War
Sandwich was based at Hong Kong when war was declared, and patrolled the Tsushima Strait for German merchant shipping before sailing east in November 1939 to return to the United Kingdom in December with convoy HG 11. She escorted convoys between Liverpool and Gibraltar until May 1940 and then coastal and Western Approaches convoys rescuing survivors from the sunken freighters King Idwal and Anten of convoy OB 244 in November 1940.

Sandwich began refit at Tilbury in December and resumed convoy escort duties in April 1941 assigned to the 43rd Escort Group. Type 271 radar was installed during refit at Belfast from January through March 1942, and the original .50 caliber anti-aircraft machine guns were replaced with Oerlikon 20 mm cannon during a shorter refit in October. Sandwich was credited with sinking U-213 while escorting convoy OS 35, and then escorted convoys in support of Operation Torch until refit on the River Tyne from February through July 1943.

Upon completion of trials and workup, Sandwich escorted convoys between Liverpool and Sierra Leone as part of the 38th Escort Group from August 1943 until retirement in June 1944. Planned refit at Brindisi was not completed, and the ship was towed to Bizerte in 1945.

Convoys escorted

Disposal and fate
Sandwich was sold at Bizerte in 1946 for £3,050 to local interests for mercantile service.  Some hold that she was scrapped after conversion was abandoned. Others say that she was renamed Prince Albert in 1946, then owned by Hui Bon Hua of Tunis and registered at that port as the mercantile Amoy. On 18 February 1948 Amoy foundered outside Port La Nouvelle, on a voyage from Oran to Sète with a cargo of oranges. Two lives were lost; 28 crew and 6 passengers were rescued. The wreck was cleared later in 1948.

Notes

References

See also
 Clearance of the wreck of Amoy in 1948 (Port La Nouvelle official site)

 

1927 ships
Ships built on the River Tyne
Bridgewater-class sloops